John Maxwell Lineham Love (7 December 1924 – 25 April 2005) was a Rhodesian racing driver. He participated in 10 Formula One World Championship Grands Prix, debuting on 29 December 1962. He achieved one podium, and scored a total of six championship points. He also won the 1962 British Saloon Car Championship, now known as the British Touring Car Championship. All but one of his Formula One entries were in races held within Africa, either as championship or non-championship rounds.

Love was born in Bulawayo. He attended Gifford High School. He started his car racing career in a single-seat Cooper F3 with a Manx Norton 500 cc engine after racing a Triumph Grand Prix motorcycle, which Love then-allowed Jim Redman to ride when starting his race career, in recognition of Redman's assistance in preparing and maintaining Love's Cooper.

Six times South African Formula One Champion in the 1960s, he had originally shone in the European Formula Junior firmament back in 1961–62 at the wheel of a Cooper-Austin from Ken Tyrrell's team. An unfortunate accident at Albi resulted in a very badly broken arm and effectively thwarted his chances of moving into full-time Formula One, but he came close when he was nominated as Phil Hill's replacement in the works Cooper team for the 1964 Italian Grand Prix at Monza.

He was a regular contestant in the South African Grand Prix from 1965 to 1972. He was leading the 1967 South African Grand Prix at Kyalami in his 2.7 L Climax-engined Cooper, when a misfire prompted him to make a precautionary stop for extra fuel. He dropped back to finish second behind the works Cooper-Maserati of Pedro Rodríguez.

Love would dominate racing in southern Africa in the 1960s, winning the South African Formula One Championship six times in succession from 1964 to 1969. He would also win his home race, the Rhodesian Grand Prix, six times.

He owned the Jaguar dealership in Bulawayo and had his own stock car racing team in the 1980s. He died in 2005, aged 80, from cancer, in Bulawayo.

Racing record

Complete Formula One World Championship results
(key)

Complete Formula One non-championship results
(key)

Complete British Saloon Car Championship results
(key) (Races in bold indicate pole position; races in italics indicate fastest lap.)

References

External links
 F1 Rejects - To Have Loved and Lost

1924 births
2005 deaths
Deaths from cancer in Zimbabwe
Rhodesian people of British descent
British Touring Car Championship drivers
British Touring Car Championship Champions
Sportspeople from Bulawayo
Rhodesian Formula One drivers
Cooper Formula One drivers
Team Gunston Formula One drivers
White Rhodesian people
Formula One team owners
Formula One team principals